First Lady of Cyprus refers to the wife of the president of Cyprus. The country's current first lady is Andri Moustakoudes, wife of President Nicos Anastasiades, who has held the position since 2013.

First ladies of Cyprus

References

Cyprus